Mithivedi is a 2012 Australian Tamil-language war-drama film starring Daniel Balaji and Neelima Rani. The film is directed and produced by Anand Maiyur Srinivas, an Australian-based finance consultant turned short filmmaker. The film talks about the struggles of a mother who is trying to save her baby after getting stuck in a minefield in Sri Lanka during the civil war. The film released online directly and is the first Tamil film to do so. The film was shot in around five days near Chengalpattu.

Cast
 Daniel Balaji as Asoka
 Neelima Rani as Selvi

Controversy 
The media inaccurately reported that a still from this film was for Maattrraan (2012) with several magazines reporting that Daniel Balaji was part of that film after the still was posted on Facebook.

References

External links 

2010s Tamil-language films
Australian war drama films
2012 films
Indian war drama films
2010s Australian films